Summernationals (also style SummerNationals) may refer to:

New England Summer Nationals
UMP DIRTcar Summer Nationals; see United Midwestern Promoters
AHRA SummerNationals; see American Hot Rod Association
NHRA Summernationals
USS Summer Nationals; see United States Swimming National Championships
Summer Nationals (EP), a covers EP by The Offspring

See also
Dominican Summer League Nationals
Summernats